Heli Speek (born Häili Speek; 15 May 1948) is an Estonian documentary filmmaker. She is best known for her award-winning documentary titled Metskuninganna ('Forest Queen'). The film was released in 1999, it is a 28-minute documentary about a woman who lives alone in an Estonian forest with her dogs. For the film, Ms. Speek won first prize for a documentary short at the 2000 Balticum Film Festival in Denmark and the Best Documentary Award at the 2000  in Finland.

Personal life
Heli Speek is the daughter of Jaan Speek and Aino Võõbus. She was married to Estonian novelist Olev Remsu and has two daughters: Mari (born 1979) and Kadriliis (born 1981), as well as a grandson named Anti (born 2004).

External links

Interview with Heli Speek

References

1948 births
Living people
Estonian film directors
Date of birth missing (living people)